Rameh Kuh (also Romanized as Rameh Kūh; also known as Ramekān) is a village in Nasrabad Rural District, in the Central District of Taft County, Yazd Province, Iran. At the 2006 census, its population was 72, in 22 families.

References 

Populated places in Taft County